Bacchawali Tope (literal translation: The cannon which induces child birth) is a cannon which lies in the Nizamat Fort Campus on the garden space between the Nizamat Imambara and the Hazarduari Palace and to the east of the old Madina Mosque in the city of Murshidabad in the Indian state of West Bengal. The cannon consists two pieces of different diameters. The cannon was made between the 12th and 14th century, probably by the Mohammeddan rulers of Gaur. It originally lied on the sand banks of Ichaganj. However, it is unknown that how it came in Ichaganj. It was used to protect the city of Murshidabad from north-western attacks. After the 1846 fire of the Nizamat Imambara the Imambara was rebuilt, then after the completion of the new Imambara the cannon was shifted to its present site by Sadeq Ali Khan, the architect of the sacred Nizamat Imambara under the suggestion of Sir Henry Torrens, the then agent of the Governor General at Murshidabad.

Etymology 
It is heard that this cannon was fired only once and when it was done it produced a huge explosive sound, within a radius of about 10 miles. This sound made most of the pregnant women of the city to give birth to their child. This cannon is believed to get its name from there, so the cannon has been named, Bacchawali Tope. Bacchawali means the one who produces child birth while Tope means cannon. Thus, the total sums up to Bacchawali Tope, which means the cannon which produces child birth.

Features 
 
The muzzle of the cannon is 1 foot and 7 inches. There are eleven rings fixed to the wrought iron barrel. Petals are drawn on this iron cannon which decorate the muzzle and one of the rings resemble a string of beads. Near the muzzle, on the upper half of the barrel surface, are 14 lines (7 on each side). These lines are of brass. There are 8 smaller rings attached at various points on the cannon. The cannon weighs around 7657 kg. and it is said that for a single shelling it requires about 18 kg of gunpowder.

Map

External links 

 

Tourist attractions in Murshidabad
Individual cannons
Artillery of India
Military history of India
Bengal Subah